Anydraula pericompsa is a moth in the family Crambidae. It is found in Australia, where it has been recorded from Queensland and the Northern Territory.

References

Acentropinae
Moths of Australia